The 2019 Mansfield District Council election took place on 2 May 2019, to elect all 36 seats to the Mansfield District Council in Nottinghamshire, England. It was prior to the election run by the Mansfield Independent Forum.

Election Results
As of January 2020 the council composition is:

Labour Party (UK): 14
Mansfield Independent Forum: 14
Independent (politician): 6
Conservative Party UK: 2

Results by ward

Abbott
Answer was elected as a UKIP councillor in 2015 before rejoining the Mansfield Independent Forum.

Berry Hill

Brick Kiln

Broomhill

Bull Farm and Pleasley Hill

Carr Bank and Ravensdale

Eakring

Grange Farm

Holly

Hornby

Kings Walk
Between 2017-19 the former Mansfield Independent councillor sat as a Conservative.

Kingsway

Ladybrook

Lindhurst

Ling Forest

Manor
In the 2015 elections, Manor ward went uncontested.

Market Warsop

Maun Valley

Meden

Netherfield

Newgate
Sissons was originally elected in 2015 for the Mansfield Independent Forum but defected in 2018 with Stephen Garner to sit as an Independent.

Newlands

Oakham

Oak Tree
Hopewell was previously elected in 2011 and 2015 as the Labour councillor for the ward but later defected.

Park Hall

Peafields

Penniment

Portland

Racecourse
Garner was originally elected as Mansfield Independent Forum however later left the forum in 2018 to run for mayor as an independent.

Ransom Wood

Sandhurst
Due to Andy Abrahams winning the Mayoral election, a by-election will take place in Sandhurst on the 27th of June 2019. Dave Saunders went on to win the subsequent by-election.

Sherwood

Warsop Carrs

Woodhouse

Woodlands

Yeoman Hill

Changes between 2019 and 2023

Sandhurst By-Election

References

Mansfield District Council elections
2019 English local elections
May 2019 events in the United Kingdom
2010s in Nottinghamshire